Michael "Mookie" Blaiklock is an American actor and writer who has starred in the television series Secret Girlfriend and Don't Trust the B---- in Apartment 23.

Biography
Blaiklock was born and raised in Ashland, Massachusetts. While at Emerson College in Boston, he wrote and performed in the sketch group Swolen Monkey Showcase.

In addition to being a series regular on Secret Girlfriend and Don't Trust the B--- in Apartment 23, Blaiklock has appeared on Always Sunny in Philadelphia, The Sarah Silverman Program, Hung, Melrose Place, Desperate Housewives, and in the feature film Fired Up!.

Blaiklock was nicknamed Mookie as a child after NBA basketball player Mookie Blaylock. He is a frequent performer at the Upright Citizens Brigade Theater in Los Angeles, often with his sketch group A Kiss from Daddy.

Filmography

References

External links
 
 

21st-century American male actors
American male comedians
American male film actors
Year of birth missing (living people)
American male television actors
Emerson College alumni
Living people
Male actors from Massachusetts
People from Ashland, Massachusetts
Upright Citizens Brigade Theater performers
21st-century American comedians